Mary Pearson may refer to:

 Mary E. Pearson (born 1955), American children's writer
 Mary Martha Pearson (1798–1871), English portrait painter